List of shipwrecks in 1909 includes ships sunk, foundered, grounded, or otherwise lost during 1909.

January

2 January

5 January

6 January

8 January

11 January

12 January

15 January

17 January

19 January

20 January

21 January

22 January

23 January

24 January

25 January

26 January

27 January

28 January

30 January

31 January

Unknown date

February

1 February

2 February

4 February

5 February

8 February

9 February

10 February

12 February

13 February

14 February

15 February

16 February

17 February

19 February

20 February

21 February

22 February

23 February

24 February

26 February

28 February

March

1 March

3 March

4 March

5 March

6 March

8 March

10 March

11 March

12 March

15 March

20 March

21 March

22 March

23 March

24 March

25 March

26 March

29 March

31 March

Unknown date

April

3 April

6 April

7 April

8 April

9 April

12 April

13 April

14 April

15 April

16 April

17 April

18 April

19 April

21 April

22 April

25 April

26 April

29 April

30 April

May

1 May

2 May

3 May

5 May

7 May

10 May

14 May

18 May

19 May

20 May

21 May

24 May

26 May

27 May

29 May

30 May

31 May

Unknown date

June

4 June

6 June

8 June

9 June

11 June

12 June

14 June

15 June

17 June

18 June

20 June

21 June

22 June

24 June

25 June

27 June

28 June

30 June

July

1 July

2 July

8 July

9 July

10 July

12 July

15 July

16 July

20 July

23 July

24 July

25 July

27 July

28 July

31 July

August

1 August

4 August

5 August

6 August

10 August

11 August

13 August

15 August

17 August

18 August

19 August

20 August

22 August

23 August

25 August

26 August

28 August

30 August

31 August

Unknown date

September

3 September

4 September

5 September

7 September

8 September

12 September

13 September

15 September

16 September

18 September

19 September

20 September

21 September

25 September

26 September

27 September

29 September

30 September

Unknown date

October

1 October

3 October

4 October

5 October

6 October

9 October

10 October

11 October

12 October

13 October

14 October

15 October

16 October

18 October

19 October

23 October

24 October

25 October

26 October

28 October

29 October

30 October

31 October

November

2 November

3 November

4 November

5 November

6 November

7 November

12 November

13 November

14 November

15 November

16 November

17 November

18 November

20 November

22 November

23 November

24 November

25 November

26 November

27 November

29 November

30 November

Unknown date

December

1 December

2 December

3 December

5 December

6 December

8 December

9 December

10 December

12 December

13 December

16 December

17 December

20 December

22 December

26 December

29 December

31 December

Unknown date

Unknown date

References

1909
 
Ship